WVN may refer to:
 West Virginia Northern Railroad
Women's Voices Now, short-film festival
JadeWeserAirport in Wilhelmshaven, Germany (IATA code WVN)